The Perth Cup is a Perth Racing Group 2 Thoroughbred horse race run under quality handicap conditions over a distance of  at Ascot Racecourse in Perth, Western Australia in January, usually on New Year's Day. The total prize money is $400,000.

History

Distance
 1887–1946 - Two miles (~3,219 metres)
 1947–1961 - Two miles and 11 yards (~3,230 metres)
 1962–1972 - Two miles (~3,219 metres)
 1972–2008 - 3,200 metres
 2009 onwards - 2,400 metres

Grade
 1887–1978 - Principal race
 1972–1992 - Group 1
 1993 onwards - Group 2

Records
Mr. P.A. Connolly had an amazing five consecutive and two later wins in the Perth Cup, with Blue Spec (in 1904), Czarowitch (1905), May King (1906), Post Town (1907), Scorcher (1908), Jolly Beggar (1910) and Jolly Cosy (a son of Jolly Beggar) in 1922.

Winners
 
 2023 - Buster Bash
 2022 - Midnight Blue
 2021 - Neufbosc
 2020 - Mississippi Delta
 2019 - Star Exhibit
 2018 - Material Man
 2016 (Dec. 31) - Star Exhibit
 2016 (Jan. 2) - Delicacy
 2015 - Real Love
 2014 - Black Tycoon
 2013 - Talent Show
 2011 (Dec. 31) - Western Jewel
 2011 (Jan. 1) - Guest Wing
 2010 - Lords Ransom
 2009 - Guyno
 2008 - Cats Fun
 2007 - Respect
 2006 - Black Tom
 2005 - Crown Prosecutor
 2004 - King Canute
 2003 - Tumeric
 2002 - Cardinal Colours
 2001 - Lottila Bay
 2000 - Luna Tudor
 1999 - King Of Saxony
 1998 - Heed The Toll
 1997 - Time Frame
 1996 - Crying Game
 1995 - Ros Reef
 1994 - Palatious
 1993 - Field Officer
 1992 - Mirror Magic
 1991 - Zamlight
 1990 - Word Of Honour
 1989 - Saratov
 1988 - Linc The Leopard
 1987 - Rocket Racer
 1986 - Ullyatt
 1985 - Phizam
 1984 - Moss Kingdom
 1983 - Bianco Lady
 1982 - Magistrate
 1981 - Magistrate
 1980 - Rothschild
 1979 - Meliador
 1978 - Golden Centre
 1977 - Muros
 1976 - Philomel
 1975 - Runyon
 1974 - Allegation
 1973 - Dayana
 1972 - Fait Accompli
 1971 - Artello Bay
 1970 - Fait Accompli
 1969 - Jenark
 1968 - Lintonmarc
 1967 - Special Reward
 1966 - Royal Coral
 1965 - Fair's Print
 1964 - Resolution
 1963 - Bay Count
 1962 - Royal Khora
 1961 - England's Dust
 1960 - Rendition
 1959 - Fairetha
 1958 - Fairetha
 1957 - Elmsfield
 1955 - Yabaroo 
 1955 - Lenarc
 1954 - Beau Scot
 1953 - Raconteur
 1952 - Avarna
 1950 - Azennis
 1949 - Beau Vasse
 1949 - Gurkha
 1948 - Kingscote
 1947 - Sydney James
 1946 - Maddington
 1945 - Gay Parade
 1944 - Loyalist
 1942 - Ragtime
 1942 - Temple Chief
 1941 - Fernridge
 1939 - Tomito
 1938 - Maikai
 1938 - Gay Balkan
 1937 - Manolive
 1936 - Picaro
 1935 - Cueesun
 1933 - Cueesun
 1932 - Alienist
 1932 - Bonny Note
 1931 - The Dimmer
 1930 - Coolbarro
 1929 - Jemidar
 1927 - Au Fait
 1927 - Phoenix Park
 1925 - Mercato
 1925 - Great Applause
 1923 - Lilypond
 1922 - Jolly Cosy
 1921 - Earl Of Seafield
 1920 - Seigneur 
 1919 - †Rivose / Eurythmic 
 1918 - Macadam
 1917 - Downing Street
 1916 - Lucky Escape
 1915 - Irish Knight
 1914 - Dollar Dictator
 1913 - Artesian
 1912 - Sparkle
 1911 - Artesian
 1910 - Jolly Beggar
 1909 - Loch Shiel
 1908 - Scorcher
 1907 - Post Town
 1906 - May King
 1905 - Czarovitch
 1904 - Blue Spec
 1903 - Cypher
 1902 - Novitiate
 1901 - Flintlock
 1901 - Australian
 1900 - Carbineer
 1899 - Mural
 1898 - Le Var
 1897 - Snapshot
 1896 - Inverary
 1895 - Durable
 1894 - Scarpia
 1893 - Scarpia
 1892 - Wandering Willie
 1891 - The Duke
 1890 - Wandering Willie
 1889 - Aim
 1888 - Telephone
 1887 - First Prince

† Dead heat

2008 race fall
The 2008 Perth Cup was marred by a six-horse fall which resulted in three jockeys being taken to hospital with minor injuries. Following a stewards inquiry, apprentice jockey Chloe Chatfield was suspended for 10 weeks. The race was won by favourite Cats Fun.

See also

 List of Australian Group races
 Group races
 Australian horse-racing

References

Horse races in Australia
Open long distance horse races
Sport in Perth, Western Australia